Nacella kerguelenensis is a southern, cold-water species of limpet, a marine gastropod mollusc in the family Nacellidae, the true limpets.

Distribution
This true limpet is endemic to Australia's sub-Antarctic Macquarie, Heard, and McDonald islands, and France's Kerguélen Islands.

References

 Powell A. W. B., William Collins Publishers Ltd, Auckland 1979 
 Australian Government

Nacellidae
Gastropods of Australia
Gastropods described in 1877